Michif (also Mitchif, Mechif, Michif-Cree, Métif, Métchif, French Cree) is one of the languages of the Métis people of Canada and the United States, who are the descendants of First Nations (mainly Cree, Nakota, and Ojibwe) and fur trade workers of white ancestry (mainly French and Scottish Canadians). Michif emerged in the early 19th century as a mixed language and adopted a consistent character between about 1820 and 1840.

The word Michif is from a variant pronunciation of the French word . Some Métis people prefer this word (Michif) to describe their nationality when speaking English and use it for anything related to Métis people, including any languages they happen to speak. According to the Gabriel Dumont Institute (GDI), the word Michif, when used for a language, is used to describe at least three distinct types of speech. Northern Michif (in Saskatchewan) is essentially a variety of Cree with a small number of French loanwords. Michif French is a variety of Canadian French with some Cree loanwords and syntax (word order). Michif used without any qualification can also describe the mixed language which borrows heavily from both Cree and French. According to theories of self-determination and self-identification, the GDI refers to all of these speech varieties as Michif because many Métis community members use the term that way, even though these varieties are widely different in their linguistic details. The remainder of this article deals primarily with the mixed language that has many features from both French and Cree.

The number of Michif speakers is estimated at fewer than 1,000; it was probably double or triple this number at the close of the 19th century, but never much higher. Currently, Michif is spoken in scattered Métis communities in the provinces of Saskatchewan and Manitoba in Canada and in North Dakota in the U.S., with about 50 speakers in Alberta, all over age 60. There are some 230 speakers of Michif in the United States (down from 390 at the 1990 census), most of whom live in North Dakota, particularly in the Turtle Mountain Indian Reservation. There are around 300 Michif speakers in the Northwest Territories, northern Canada.

Michif combines Cree and Métis French (Rhodes 1977, Bakker 1997:85), a variety of Canadian French, with some additional borrowing from English and indigenous languages of the Americas such as Ojibwe and Assiniboine. In general, Michif noun phrase phonology, lexicon, morphology, and syntax are derived from Métis French, while verb phrase phonology, lexicon, morphology, and syntax are from a southern variety of Plains Cree (a western dialect of Cree). Articles and adjectives are also of Métis French origin but demonstratives are from Plains Cree.

The Michif language is unusual among mixed languages, in that rather than forming a simplified grammar, it developed by incorporating complex elements of the chief languages from which it was born. French-origin noun phrases retain lexical gender and adjective agreement; Cree-origin verbs retain much of their polysynthetic structure. This suggests that instead of haltingly using words from another's tongue, the people who gradually came to speak Michif were fully fluent in both French and Cree.

The Michif language was first brought to scholarly attention in 1976 by John Crawford at the University of North Dakota. Much of the subsequent research on Michif was also related to UND, including four more pieces by Crawford, plus work by Evans, Rhodes, and Weaver.

Orthography 
Michif lacks a unified spelling standard.  Some systems are phonetic, with each letter having only one sound (often based on English standards), while other are etymological, with French-derived words spelled by French standards, and Cree-derived words spelled using the "Standard Roman Orthography" system.

In 2004, Robert Papen proposed a new system that was mostly phonetic.

The government of Manitoba published a translation of its annual report on The Path to Reconciliation Act in Michif in June 2017.  Its choice of spelling system can be seen in this extract:

Here, as in Papen's system, different vowel qualities are marked by writing the character doubled ("a" vs. "aa") instead of using diacritical marks as usual for Cree.  For consistency, this system is also extended to the French-derived words so that French  ('whites') becomes  but  ('the indigenous') becomes .

Phonology
Michif as recorded starting in the 1970s combined two separate phonological systems: one for French origin elements, and one for Cree origin elements (Rhodes 1977, 1986). In this variety of Michif, the French elements were pronounced in ways that have distinctively Canadian French values for the vowels, while the Cree elements have distinctively Cree values for vowels. Nonetheless, there is some Cree influence on French words in the stress system (Rosen 2006). But by the year 2000 there were Michif speakers who had collapsed the two systems into a single system (Rosen 2007).

Consonants

Vowels

Michif has eleven oral vowels and four nasalized vowels.

Oral vowels

Nasalized vowels

The following four vowels are nasalized in Michif:

Schwa-deletion
A schwa /ə/ appearing between two consonants in French-origin words is dropped in Michif. Examples of this process are listed in the table below.

Elision in Michif

Rosen (2007) states that since all French-derived vowel-initial nouns in Michif have been lexicalized as consonant-initial, the French rule of elision, which deletes certain vowels (particularly schwa) before vowel-initial words, for ex.,  'the friend' but  'the friend'), cannot apply in Michif. Curiously, she admits that elision is potentially still active since vowel-initial English loanwords allow elision, as in  'a bowl of oatmeal'. Papen (2014) has countered that elision is, in fact, just as active in French-derived words as is liaison. However, elision does not occur before Cree vowel-initial nouns. This strongly suggests that French phonological rules, such as liaison and elision still function in Michif, but that they apply only to French-derived words and not to Cree-derived ones, implying that Michif phonology is at least partially stratified, contrary to what Rosen (2007) proposes.

Liaison consonants
In French, a liaison is used to bridge the gap between word-final and word-initial vowel sounds. Whether liaison still exists in Michif is a much discussed theoretical issue. Scholars such as Bakker (1997), Rhodes (1986), and Rosen (2007) have suggested that liaison no longer exists in Michif and that all words that etymologically began with a vowel in French now begin with a consonant, the latter resulting from a variety of sources, including a liaison consonant. Their arguments are based on the fact that the expected liaison consonant (for example) will not show up and instead, the consonant will be , as in  'a bear' The above authors cite over a dozen words with an unexpected initial consonant. Papen (2003, 2014) has countered this argument by showing that, statistically, the vast majority of so-called initial consonants in Michif reflect the expected liaison consonant and that only about 13% of so-called initial consonants are unexpected.

Palatalization
This may occur word-initially or word-internally before front vowels.

Vocabulary
A comparison of some common words in English, French, Michif, and Cree:

Syntax

Noun phrase
Nouns are almost always accompanied by a French-origin determiner or a possessive.

Cree-origin demonstratives can be added to noun phrases, in which case the Cree gender (animate or inanimate) is that of the corresponding Cree noun.

Adjectives are French-origin (Cree has no adjectives), and as in French they are either pre- or postnominal. Prenominal adjectives agree in gender (like French), however, postnominal adjectives do not agree in gender (unlike French).

Verb phrase
The verb phrase is that of Plains Cree-origin with little reduction (there are no dubitative or preterit verb forms).

Word order
Michif word order is basically that of Cree (relatively free). However, the more French-origin elements are used, the closer the syntax seems to conform to norms of spoken French.

Lexicon
Nouns: 			83-94% French-origin; others are mostly Cree-origin, Ojibwe-origin, or English-origin
Verbs: 		88-99% Cree-origin
Question words: Cree-origin
Personal pronouns: Cree
Postpositions: Cree-origin
Prepositions: French-origin
Conjunctions: 55% Cree-origin; 40% French-origin
Numerals: French-origin
Demonstratives: Cree-origin

The Lord's Prayer in English, French, and Michif:

Language genesis

In languages of mixed ethnicities, the language of the mother usually provides the grammatical system, while the language of the father provides the lexicon. The reasons are as follows: children tend to know their mother's language better; in the case of the Métis, the men were often immigrants, whereas the women were native to the region. If the bilingual children need to use either of their parents' languages to converse with outsiders, it is most likely to be the language of their mothers. Thus, the model of language-mixing predicts that Michif should have a Cree grammatical system and French lexicon. Michif, however, has Cree verb phrases and French noun phrases. The explanation for this unusual distribution of Cree and French elements in Michif lies in the polysynthetic nature of Cree morphology. In Cree, verbs can be very complex with up to twenty morphemes, incorporated nouns and unclear boundaries between morphemes. In other words, in Cree verbs it is very difficult to separate grammar from lexicon. As a result, in Michif the grammatical and bound elements are almost all Cree, and the lexical and free elements are almost all French; verbs are almost totally Cree, because the verb consists of grammatical and bound elements. Seen in this way, it can be argued that Michif is fundamentally Cree, but with heavy French borrowing (somewhat like Maltese, a mixed Arabic-Italian language classified as fundamentally Arabic). The Métis in addition have their own variety of French with Cree borrowings -- Métis French.

Language revitalization 
Métis cultural centres such as the Michif Cultural and Métis Resource Institute in St. Albert, Alberta, the Métis Culture and Heritage Resource Centre in Winnipeg, and the Gabriel Dumont Institute of Native Studies and Applied Research are attempting to revive the language through public outreach.

As of 2013, the Northern Journal reports that "Aboriginal language and culture is becoming increasingly visible" in Alberta, as Alberta's Northland School Division, "serving mostly First Nations and Métis students in the northern part of the province" has expanded its community partnerships and culture camps.

See also

Bungi Creole
Chinook Jargon
Journal of Indigenous Studies
Lists of extinct languages
Lists of endangered languages
Lists of languages

Notes

Bibliography

 Barkwell, Lawrence J., Leah Dorion, and Audreen Hourie. Métis legacy Michif culture, heritage, and folkways. Métis legacy series, v. 2. Saskatoon: Gabriel Dumont Institute, 2006. 
 Barkwell, L.J., (Editor). 2004. La Lawng: Michif Peekishkwewin, The Heritage Language of the Canadian Metis, Volume One, Language Practice Winnipeg: Pemmican Publications. 
 Barkwell, L.J., (Editor). 2004. La Lawng: Michif Peekishkwewin, The Heritage Language of the Canadian Metis, Volume Two, Language Theory. Winnipeg: Pemmican Publications. 
 Barkwell, Lawrence J., Leah Dorion and Darren Prefontaine. "Metis Legacy: A Historiography and Annotated Bibliography". Winnipeg: Pemmican Publications Inc. and Saskatoon: Gabriel Dumont Institute, 2001. 
 Bakker, Peter: Spelling systems for Michif: an overview. In: La Lawng: Michif Peekishkwewin. The Heritage Language of the Canadian Metis. Vol 2: Language Theory. Barkwell, Lawrence (Ed.). Pemmican Publications/Manitoba Métis Federation Michif Language Program, Winnipeg, Manitoba, Canada: pp. 11‑28, 2004. 
 Bakker, Peter: The Michif language of the Métis. In: La Lawng: Michif Peekishkwewin. The Heritage Language of the Canadian Metis. Vol 2: Language Theory. Barkwell, Lawrence (Ed.). Pemmican Publications/Manitoba Métis Federation Michif Language Program, Winnipeg, Manitoba, Canada: pp. 5‑9, 2004. 
 Bakker, Peter: The verb in Michif. In: La Lawng: Michif Peekishkwewin. The Heritage Language of the Canadian Metis. Vol 2: Language Theory. Barkwell, Lawrence (Ed.). Pemmican Publications/Manitoba Métis Federation Michif Language Program, Winnipeg, Manitoba, Canada: pp. 63‑80, 2004. 
 Bakker, Peter: What is Michif? In: La Lawng: Michif Peekishkwewin. The Heritage Language of the Canadian Metis. Vol 1: Language Practice. Barkwell, Lawrence (Ed.). Pemmican Publications/Manitoba Métis Federation Michif Language Program, Winnipeg, Manitoba, Canada: pp. 5‑7, 2004. 
 Bakker, Peter; Barkwell, Lawrence: Storytelling and Mythology. In: La Lawng: Michif Peekishkwewin. The Heritage Language of the Canadian Metis. Vol 2: Language Theory. Barkwell, Lawrence (Ed.). Pemmican Publications/Manitoba Métis Federation Michif Language Program, Winnipeg, Manitoba, Canada: pp. 83‑96, 2004. 
 Bakker, Peter. 1997.  A language of our own: The genesis of Michif, the mixed Cree-French language of the Canadian Métis.  New York, Oxford University Press.
 Bakker, Peter and Robert Papen. 1997. Michif: A mixed language based on Cree and French. In S. Thomason (ed.) Contact languages: A wider perspective. Philadelphia: John Benjamins, p. 295-363.
 Bloomfield, Leonard (1984) Cree-English Lexicon Human Area Relations Files, New Haven, CT.
 Crawford, John. "Speaking Michif in four Métis communities." Canadian Journal of Native Studies 3.1 (1983): 47–55.
 Crawford, John. "What is Michif? Language in the Metis tradition." Jennifer S.H. Brown and Jacqueline Peterson, eds. The New Peoples: Being and Becoming Metis in North America (1985): 231–241.
 Crawford, John. "Linguistic and sociolinguistic relationships in the Michif language." Proceedings of the Linguistic Circle of Manitoba and North Dakota 3 (1973): 8-22.
 Evans, Donna. 1982. "On coexistence and convergence of two phonological systems in Michif." Work Papers of the Summer Institute of Linguistics, University of North Dakota Session, 26, p. 158-173.
 Fleury, N. and L. J. Barkwell. 2000. La Lawng: Michif Peekishkwewin: The Canadian Michif Language Dictionary. Winnipeg: Metis Resource Centre.
 Gillon, Carrie and Nicole Rosen. 2016. Critical mass in Michif. Journal of Pidgin and Creole Languages 31: 113–140.
 Papen, Robert. 2003. "Michif: One phonology or two?" In Y. Chung, C. Gillon and R. Wokdak (eds) University of British Columbia Working Papers in Linguistics, Vol. 12, Proceedings of the Eighth Workshop on Structure and Constituency in Language of the Americas, p. 47-58.
 Papen, Robert. 2004. "Michif spelling conventions: Proposal for a unified Michif writing system. In L. Barkwell (ed.) La lawng: Michif peekishkwewin. Winnipeg, MB: Pemmican Publications, p. 29-53.
 Rhodes, Richard A. 1977. French Cree—a case of borrowing. Actes du Huitième Congrès des Algonquinistes. Wm. Cowan (ed.), Ottawa: Carleton University. p. 6-25.
 Rhodes, Richard A. 1986. Métif—a second look. Actes du Septième Congrès des Algonquinistes. Wm. Cowan (ed.), Ottawa: Carleton University. p. 287-296.
 Rhodes, Richard A. 1987. Les Contes Metif—Metif Myths. Papers of the Eighteenth Algonquian Conference. Wm. Cowan (ed.), Ottawa: Carleton University. p. 297-301.
 Rhodes, Richard A. 1992. Language Shift in Algonquian. International Journal of the Sociology of Language. 93:87-92.
 Rhodes, Richard A. 2001. Text Strategies in Métchif. Papers of the Thirty-second Algonquian Conference. H. C. Wolfart (ed.), Winnipeg: University of Manitoba. p. 455-469.
 Rosen, Nicole. 2006. Language Contact and Stress Assignment. Sprachtypologie und Universalienforschung. 59:170-190.
 Rosen, Nicole. 2007. Domains in Michif Phonology. Ph.D. Thesis. Department of Linguistics. University of Toronto.
 Papen, Robert. 2005. Le mitchif: langue franco-crie des Plaines. In A. Valdman, J. Auger & D. Piston-Hatlen (eds). Saint-François, QC: Presses de l'Université Laval, p. 327-347.
 Weaver, Deborah. 1982. Obviation in Michif. Work Papers of the Summer Institute of Linguistics, University of North Dakota Session, 26, p. 174-262.
 Weaver, Deborah. 1983. The effect of language change and death on obviation in Michif. In W. Cowan (ed.) Actes du Quatorzième Congrès des Algonquinistes. Ottawa: Carleton University Press, p. 261-268.
Zoldy, Grace. 2003. The Lord's Prayer. In Li Liivr Oche Michif Ayamiiawina - The Book of Michif Prayers. Camperville Michif Cree Ritual Language Project.

External links

Michif Language Lessons
LearnMichif.com
Michif Dictionary
Li Liivr Oche Michif Ayamiiawina: The Book of Michif Prayers
Audio and video of Michif speakers, with French and English translations
Native Languages of the Americas: Michif (Mitchif, Metis Creole, French Cree)
OLAC resources in and about the Michif language
ELAR Archive of Documenting Michif Variation

Indigenous languages of the North American Plains
Languages of Canada
Endangered Algic languages
Mixed languages
Métis culture
Métis in the United States
French language in Canada
Cree language
Endangered Romance languages
Languages of the United States
Culture of the Canadian Prairies
North Dakota culture
Creoles of the Americas